After Sunset is the fourth EP by South Korean boy group Highlight. It was released on November 7, 2022, by Around US Entertainment and distributed by Kakao Entertainment. The mini-album contains five tracks, featuring "Alone" as a promotional single. Three photobook versions of the EP were released, titled Night, Midnight, and Dawn. A jewel case version was also included for each of the four members.

Background and album 
The group first announced their comeback through a clip at their 2022 fan concert, Highlight Sports Day. On October 16, the second day of the concert, the end credits were followed by a snippet of the song Alone and the date November 7, 2022. 

The album and single name were revealed to be After Sunset and Alone respectively, through a trailer video on October 24, confirming their comeback on November 7. The track list, promotional photos for each album version, and song previews were shown in the subsequent days leading up to the EP's release. It consists of five songs, three of which were co-written and co-produced by member Lee Gikwang.

"Alone" is described as "a pop track with a retro texture and minimalistic colour, and a retro feel at the same time." The lyrics are also said to "[express] a straightforward confession and a double message."

Track listing

Charts

Weekly charts

Monthly charts

References 

2022 EPs
Highlight (band) EPs